USS Algonquin,  completed as El Toro in 1891 for the Southern Pacific Railroad's Morgan Line, was a small harbor tug commissioned by the United States Navy 2 April 1898. Renamed Accomac, after Accomac, Virginia, June 1898, renamed Nottoway in 1918 and, after the Navy adopted alphanumeric hull numbers on 17 July 1920, classified as YT-18, a district tug. On 5 October 1942 the name was cancelled and the tug was simply YT-18 until 1944 when classification was changed to YTL-18, a little harbor tug. Over the years as a Navy tug, from 1898 to 1946, the tug served from Cuba to Boston.

Construction
The steam tug El Toro was built at Newport News, Virginia by Newport News Shipbuilding for the Southern Pacific Railroad Company owned Morgan Line with delivery 20 May 1891. The tug was designed by naval architect Horace See with a quadruple expansion steam engine, then an unusual feature. El Toro was built principally as a fire boat with towing capability to tow the Morgan Line ships arriving or departing New York between the passenger terminal at North River Pier 37 and the cargo terminal at Pier 25. El Toro was the second ship, hull number 2, constructed by the then small shipyard, and its success led to building the line's cargo and passenger ships El Sud (hull #3), El Norte (#4),  and El Rio (#5) and El Cid (#6) as its next four ships.

Two Worthington fire and bilge pumps provided water for fire fighting or bilge pumping.

A summary of the previous year written in 1895 gives a picture of the tug's duties:

Steamships towed from Company's piers to Erie Basin, or distance equal thereto: 70
Steamships towed from piers Nos. 37 to 25: 132
Steamships docked at piers Nos. 37 and 25: 152
Lighters towed and moored: 520
Miles run without tow: 5342
On fire duty: Remaining time
Days in commission: 351
Coal consumed per day" 1 1/6 tons.

El Toro was the flagship of the New York Naval Reserve and in 1891 the new tug is noted as taking the commander to the exercise while flying the new flag of the Naval Reserve.

Navy purchase and service
Due to the impending war with Spain El Toro was purchased by the Navy on 26 March 1898 and commissioned on 2 April 1898 with the name USS Algonquin, Ensign Walter S. Crosley in command.

Ensign Crosley described his reporting to the New York Navy Yard on 1 April 1898 with orders to report as a watch standing officer aboard  and, upon being redirected to "fit out and command" Algonquin to be ready for sea immediately only to find the old Morgan tug as an "April Fool's joke." Crosley found there was no crew and that fitting out meant acquiring nearly everything from hawsers to stores, which he had to load aboard himself from a commandeered horse cart.

Algonquin departed the Navy Yard on the afternoon of 4 April for Key West, Florida with a quickly assembled crew, only two of which had been in the Navy and only four had been to sea, in company with the tug  commanded by Lieutenant York Noble. Nezinscot turned back while still in Buttermilk Channel with Algonquin continuing alone, reaching Scotland Lightship at about eight in the evening, until suffering weather damage to a hatch cover and having to seek shelter behind the Delaware Breakwater for pumping out. After a delay of nearly a day the tug got underway for Port Royal, South Carolina where Nezinscot caught up and, on meeting more poor weather on the way south, took the smaller and slower Algonquin in tow until breaking down and then being towed by Algonquin until reaching the fleet at Key West on 13 April.

Once with the fleet the tug made regular trips to Cuba towing captured vessels to Key West and making logistics runs that included dispatches and even laundry, the loss of which in an involved the tug almost sinking when seas swept over the ship taking boxes and the laundry from lashings on top of the deck house.

On 15 June 1898, Algonquin was renamed Accomac. The vessel served at Key West through end of the year. In January 1899, she was reassigned to the Cuban occupation forces and was based at Havana, Cuba. Between late 1900 and December 1911, the small ship successively served as a yard tug at Port Royal, South Carolina, Key West, and Pensacola, Florida. On 14 February 1907 she sank the steamer  in a collision off the Palafox Street Wharf, Pensacola, Florida.  On 4 December 1911, Accomac arrived at the Boston Navy Yard where she spent the remainder of her active career. She was renamed Nottoway on 1 August 1918.

On 17 July 1920 the Navy adopted the alphanumeric system of hull designations with Nottoway being designated YT-18.  On 5 October 1942, her name was cancelled, and she became simply YT-18. On 15 May 1944, the tug was redesignated a small harbor tug, YTL-18. She served at Boston as a yard tug through the end of World War II.

YTL-18 was placed out of service at Boston on 3 April 1946, and her name was struck from the Navy List on 17 April 1946. On 15 October 1946, she was sold to Mr. Arthur M. Hall, of Boston, Massachusetts, presumably for scrapping.

Awards
Sampson Medal
Spanish Campaign Medal
World War I Victory Medal
American Defense Service Medal
American Campaign Medal
World War II Victory Medal

Footnotes

References

Bibliography

Duplicate DANFS entries are at Accomac and Nottoway

External links
 

Spanish–American War auxiliary ships of the United States
Tugs of the United States Navy
1891 ships
Ships built in Newport News, Virginia